Chile competed at the 2022 World Aquatics Championships in Budapest, Hungary from 18 June to 3 July.

Diving

Swimming

References

Nations at the 2022 World Aquatics Championships
Chile at the World Aquatics Championships
World Aquatics Championships